Negmatullo Saidovich Kubanov (born 30 September 1963) is a Tajik major general in the Interior Ministry of Tajikistan. He is the commanding officer of the Tajik Internal Troops. He was born in Vyborg where his father was stationed as a Starshina of a mechanized infantry unit in the 30th Guards Army.

References

1963 births
Living people
Military personnel from Vyborg
Tajikistani Muslims
Tajikistani military personnel
Ministry of Internal Affairs of Tajikistan